The  Santa Rosa  was an U.S. steamship that sunk off the California coast on July 8, 1911. 192 people survived, out of about 200 people who had been on board.

References

External links 
 United States Coast Guard website, Coast Guard History, International Ice Patrol
 LighthouseFriends.com- Point Arguello Lighthouse 
 Library of Congress, Chronicling America, The San Francisco Call (California newspaper),July 9, 1911 
 Library of Congress, Chronicling America, The San Francisco Call (California newspaper),July 11, 1911, "Price Burden of Rescue Messages" 
  Library of Congress, Chronicling America, The San Francisco Call (California newspaper),July 10, 1911, "Steamship Official Lays Blame Upon Captain " 
 Library of Congress, Chronicling America, The San Francisco Call (California newspaper), April 14, 1911, "Santa Rosa Carries Many Passengers " 
 Library of Congress, Chronicling America, Tombstone Epitaph (Arizona newspaper), July 9, 1911, "Tombstoner was on Ill Fated Ship " 
 Library of Congress, Chronicling America, Bisbee Daily Review (Arizona newspaper), July 18, 1911, "Ugly Charges Given Hearing " 
 Library of Congress, Chronicling America, The Times Dispatch (Virginia newspaper), July 8, 1911, "Dashed to Pieces in Roaring Surf " 
 Library of Congress, Chronicling America, The Washington Times (Washington, D.C. newspaper), July 9, 1911, "Loss of Fourteen Lives in Wreck Laid to Business Greed " 
 Library of Congress, Chronicling America, The San Francisco Call (California newspaper), November 12, 1911, "Suit Asks for $50,000 for Second Mate's Life " 
 Library of Congress, Chronicling America, The Marion Daily Mirror (Ohio newspaper), July 11, 1911, "Wireless a Menace" 
 Library of Congress, Chronicling America, El Paso Herald (Texas newspaper), July 8, 1911, "Pacific Steamer a Wreck" 
 Library of Congress, Chronicling America, The San Francisco Call (California newspaper), July 10, 1911, "Santa Rosa Captain Acted Under Orders"
 Library of Congress, Chronicling America, The San Francisco Call (California newspaper), July 14, 1911, "Captain Must Show Wreck Messages"
 Library of Congress, Chronicling America, The San Francisco Call (California newspaper), July 15, 1911, "Price, Not Passengers, Is First"
 Library of Congress, Chronicling America, The San Francisco Call (California newspaper), September 23, 1911, "Cost First in Estimation of Steamship Company"
 Library of Congress, Chronicling America, The San Francisco Call (California newspaper), August 12, 1911, "Santa Rosa Men Must Stand Trial"
 Library of Congress, Chronicling America, The San Francisco Call (California newspaper), July 8, 1911, "Twenty Die in Santa Rosa Wreck "
 Library of Congress, Chronicling America, Bisbee Daily Review (Arizona newspaper), October 18, 1911, "Punishment for Negligence "

Steamships of the United States
Shipwrecks of the California coast
Maritime incidents in 1911